Vito Rodriguez Rodriguez (born c. 1939) was a Peruvian billionaire businessman.

See also
List of Peruvian billionaires by net worth
Fallecio el 17 de junio del 2022

References

People from Lima
National University of Engineering alumni
20th-century Peruvian businesspeople
Peruvian billionaires
Year of birth missing (living people)
2022 deaths